World Business Report is a television business news programme produced by BBC News and shown on BBC World News, the BBC News Channel and BBC One on weekdays. There are two editions broadcast each weekday, at 0530 and 0630 GMT. Each edition lasts 25 minutes. The main presenter of the programme is Sally Bundock and Victoria Valentine. Nancy Kacungira, Ben Thompson, Ben Boulos, Samantha Simmonds, Aaron Heslehurst and Alice Baxter act as relief presenters.

Other editions of World Business Report are shown on BBC World News at 0630 GMT, 0745 GMT, 1130GMT and 1430GMT and since 6 March 2023, the latter two editions are seen by  UK viewers on the BBC News Channel.

Presenters
Monday to Thursday

Morning (0530GMT, 0630GMT and 0745GMT) - Sally Bundock
Afternoon(1130GMT, 1430GMT) - Aaron Heslehurst

Friday

Morning (0530GMT, 0630GMT and 0745GMT) - Victoria Valentine
Afternoon (1130GMT, 1430GMT) - Ben Boulos

Previous presenters
Paddy O'Connell
Richard Quest
Manisha Tank
Juliette Foster
Sally Eden
Sara Coburn
Owen Thomas
Susannah Streeter
Jamie Robertson

References

External links
 BBC World Business Report
 BBC World Business Report at IMDB.com
 World Business Report promo in 1995

1995 British television series debuts
2000s British television series
2010s British television series
2020s British television series
BBC television news shows
BBC World News shows
Business-related television series in the United Kingdom
British television news shows